Piano Jazz, Piano Jazz: McPartland/Costello or Maria McPartland's Piano Jazz(2005) is an album by Marian McPartland, in collaboration with Elvis Costello. The album is a collaboration between Costello and McPartand made for the NPR radio program Piano Jazz. The album expresses Mcpartland's interpretation of standards and ballads.

Track listing

References

Marian McPartland albums
2003 albums